The 1973 Hong Kong Urban Council election was held on 7 March 1973 for the seven of the 12 elected seats of the Urban Council of Hong Kong. Two new elected seats were created in the election. 8,675 eligible voters cast their votes, the turnout rate was 27.64 per cent. 

The Reform Club of Hong Kong won four of the seven seats and the Hong Kong Civic Association won the other three. Candidates from the Reform Club, Tsin Sai-nin and Wong Pun-cheuk won the two new seats, with Wong secured the last seat of two-year term, different from the rest of the four-year terms seats. Tsin and Wong would later resign from the Reform Club in 1974, after a fallout with chairman Bernacchi.

Outcome

References

Hong Kong
Municipal election
Urban
Hong Kong municipal election
Hong Kong municipal election